The Sanskrit term, Sāmānādhikaraṇyam (Sanskrit:सामानाधिकरण्यम्), generally refers to – 'identical denotation', 'common substratum' or 'unity of substratum'.

Background

In Sanskrit grammar, Sāmānādhikaraṇyam, means appositional or syntactic relationship with agreement in gender, number, etc. Its   Tibetan equivalent is gźi mthun ñid. In Hindu philosophy, it is defined as a common reference of two words in an expression each by itself applying to a different object. According to Bhartṛhari, there are two sorts of sāmānādhikaraṇya: one between meanings and the other between words; the former is characterized by the fact that one and the same substance is understood as having different aspects and the latter by the fact that one and the same substance is referred to by different words. But actually there are four kinds of Sāmānādhikaraṇya.

Four kinds of Sāmānādhikaraṇya

Sāmānādhikaraṇya is of four kinds: (i) Bādhāyam sāmānādhikaraṇyam, which relates to bhrānti or delusion arising from error of perception; it refers to the state of mind after the delusion has been removed, (ii) Adhyāse sāmānādhikaraṇyam, which applies to the common reference of the super-imposed (āropita) and the substratum (adhisthāna);  Adhyasa  is the idea of a thing in what is not that thing that may arise in some places from external defects and in others from one’s own supposition; it refers to the state of the mind during the pendency of the delusion, (iii) Viśesane sāmānādhikaraṇyam, which arises when an object designated by a common noun is particularised by qualifying the noun by an adjective as between (a) the quality and the bearer of the quality, (b) the genus and the species, and (c) the qualification and the qualified, and (d) the part and the whole, and (iv) Aikye sāmānādhikaraṇyam relates to the removal of the apparent contradiction between two individuals or things identified by two or more words used in juxtaposition indicating an identity between their references.

A sentence is a unit of words, a single and complete expression of thought; it is a means of valid knowledge in which the relation, among the meanings of words, that is the object of its intention is not contradicted by any other means of valid knowledge and signifies more than what its constituent words convey. Sentences are of two kinds – a) Vyadhikarana – in which each word of the sentence conveys a meaning that is different from others, the words have different case and different number; and b) Sāmānādhikaraṇya – in which there is application to one thing of several words having the same case of which there is a different reason, the words are shown to stand in the relation of abiding in a common substratum, a grammatical co-ordinate relation. By essential identity is meant the relation between two different things that co-exist in the same locus (sāmānādhikaraṇyam). Sāmānādhikaraṇya refers to the relation of concurrence between the meanings of two verbs.

Implication

In the context of Brahma Sutra (III.iii.9) which reads - व्याप्तेश्च समञ्जसम् | meaning – And, because of the pervasion (of all the Vedas), it is proper (to qualify  Om  by  Udgitha ), Shankara explains that the idea of Om can never be alienated from Om, nor can the idea of Udgitha from Udgitha, since these ideas are true. In the case of superimposition, the idea of something is superimposed on something else, so that the figure of speech here involves a departure; whereas in the case of the adjectival use, a word denoting a whole is made to imply a part of itself, so that the figure of speech involves a proximity; for words indicating the whole are seen   to be used with regard to the parts as well, hence it is flawless and appropriate that Om, which is common to all the  Vedas , should be qualified by the term, Udgitha, in the text.

Patanjali establishes the fact that although an action is beyond perception, it can be known through inference and that it is distinct from a substance. In the semantic structure on which the question-answer - kim karoti – pacati is based, one has to recognize the relation of concurrence (sāmānādhikaraṇyam) between the meanings of the verbs – kṛ and pac. Nagesa advises one not to take present sāmānādhikaraṇyam as a relation such that two items between which the relation obtains refer to one and the same object, that is, co-referentially. Pāṇini School avers that three elements that are not distinct from a single substance appear to the mind separately; a locus and properties that abide in the locus. According to Bhartṛhari, there are two sorts of  sāmānādhikaraṇya: one between meanings and the other between words; the former is characterized by the fact that one and the same substance is understood as having different aspects and the latter by the fact that one and the same substance is referred to by different words. In spite of the importance of the idea that a universal includes or pervades the individuals which fall within its range, Bhartṛhari, unlike Kaiyaṭa (who was influenced by Dignāga),  did not underpin his conclusion of the qualifier-qualificand  relation with this concept glossed by Vrsabhadeva.
For Dignāga the analytic content of names is not given in any language, but constructed out of experience, not because language says so but because it is so in fact and because language is a record of facts.

Philosophical significance

In Nidarśana i.e. in direction or mention or illustration, refutation of a stated argument or comparison, the relation between two objects being untenable lends scope for the idea of similarity, which means that where there is the un-tenability of the relation without expressed or implied unity of substratum (sāmānādhikaraṇyam) there alone Nidarśana is to be accepted. Aropa is sometimes verbal and sometimes is based upon sense as the sāmānādhikaraṇya itself is expressed or conveyed; in Aropa there is no mention of two different objects being spoken of as belonging to the same substratum.

Taittiriya Upanishad (II.ii.1) tells us that Viraj , the macrocosmical food is the same as annam, the microcosmical food, their identity is obvious from their occurring in the same case (sāmānādhikaraṇyam).

Vishishtadvaita’s or Ramanuja’s doctrine of several things in a common substrate, Vishishtadvaita or qualified monism or qualified non-dualism or attributive monism believes in all diversity subsuming to an underlying unity. Vedanta Desika states that Vishishtadvaita sees Ishvara (Parabrahman) as the only reality as qualified by the sentient (chit-brahman) and insentient (achit-brahman) modes or attributes. Ramanuja's Brahman is defined by a multiplicity of qualities and properties in a single monistic entity. This doctrine is called Sāmānādhikaranya (several things in a common substrate).

Shankara, accepting  svaroopa aikyam , interprets Tat Tvam Asi to mean the Jiva and Brahman are identical and there is no difference between these two and as such is the reality, Ramanuja clarifies that when two or more words denote the same object by denoting the object through each of the different qualities of the object, then those words are called - 'Equally denoting words in all aspects' or sāmānādhikaraṇya.

Sadananda in his Sadananda, advocating Advaita, explains that the mahavakya – तत्तवमसि (Tat Twam Asi) or "Thou art That", which is co-referential expression or a proposition conveying identity, by virtue of the three relations of its term – Thou art That, these three relations are Sāmānādhikaranya or relation between two words having the same substratum, viśesana-viśesyabhāva or the relation between the imports of two words qualifying each other so as to signify a common object; and laksya-laksnabhāva or the relation between two words and an identical thing implied by them or having the same locus, here, the Inner self. In the said mahavakya, the word "That" signifying Consciousness characterized by remoteness etc., and the word "Thou" signifying Consciousness characterized by immediacy etc., both refer to one and the same Consciousness, Brahman; their mutual qualification or unity does not involve a contradiction with direct perception and other means of knowledge. Sāmānādhikaranya emphasizes identity and does not come in conflict with Satkaryavada.

References

Sanskrit grammar
Sanskrit words and phrases
Rigveda
Vedanta
 Yoga concepts